The 2012 Campeonato Ecuatoriano de Fútbol de la Serie A (known as the 2012 Copa Credife Serie A for sponsorship reasons) was the 54th season of the Serie A, Ecuador's premier football league. The season began on February 3 and ended in December 2012. Deportivo Quito was the defending champion. They were succeeded by Barcelona, who won their record-breaking 14th title.

Format
On the night of December 6, 2011, the Ecuadorian Football Federation determined that the format for 2012 will the same as the previous season.

Teams
Twelve teams competed in the 2012 Serie A season, ten of whom remained from the previous season. ESPOLI and Imbabura were relegated last season after accumulating the fewest points in the 2011 season aggregate table. They will be replaced by Técnico Universitario and Macará, the 2011 Serie B winner and runner-up, respectively. Both teams from Ambato are making returns to the Serie A. Macará is returning after one season while Técnico Universitario is returning after two.

Managerial changes

First stage
The first stage began on February 3 and ended on July 8.

Standings

Results

Second stage
The second stage began on July 13 and ended on December 2.

Standings

Results

Aggregate table

Third stage
The Third Stage began on December 9 and ended on December 16. It consisted of two playoffs.

Fourth-place playoffs
Independiente José Terán and LDU Loja played in the fourth-place playoff. By having the greater number of points in the aggregate table, Independiente José Terán will play the second leg at home.

Having won both matches, Independiente José Terán earned the Ecuador 3 berth in the 2013 Copa Sudamericana; LDU Loja earned the Ecuador 4 berth.

Second-place playoffs
Emelec and LDU Quito played the second-place playoff. By having the greater number of points in the aggregate table, Emelec will play the second leg at home.

Having won both matches, Emelec won the Ecuador 2 berth for the 2013 Copa Libertadores and the 2013 Copa Sudamericana. LDU Quito earned the Ecuador 3 berth for the 2013 Copa Libertadores.

Finals
Since Barcelona won both the first stage and second stage, the finals were not played, and Barcelona were crowned champions. They earned the Ecuador 1 berth in the 2013 Copa Libertadores and the Ecuador 1 berth in the 2013 Copa Sudamericana.

Top goalscorers

Updated as of games played on December 16, 2012.Source:

Hat tricks

4 Player scored 4 goals.

References

External links
Official website 
Football-Lineups 

2011
Ecuatoriano De Futbol Serie A
Serie A